Adedire Emmanuel Awokoya-Mebude (born 28 May 2004) is a professional footballer currently playing as a forward for Manchester City. Born in England, he is a youth international for Scotland.

Club career
Mebude joined the Scottish side Rangers at the age of ten, progressing through the academy before rejecting the offer of a contract at the age of sixteen. In September 2020, he joined the academy of Premier League side Manchester City. He signed his first professional contract with Manchester City in July 2021.

In August 2022, renewed contract talks between Mebude and Manchester City reportedly stalled, with fellow Premier League side Tottenham Hotspur linked with a move for the player, as well as PSV Eindhoven and Club Brugge.

International career
Mebude has represented Scotland at youth international level. He is also eligible to represent England and Nigeria.

Style of play
Described by Manchester City as a "skilful forward with blistering pace", Mebude is renowned for his goalscoring ability, and was named academy player's player of the year for the 2021–22 season.

Personal life
Mebude is the brother of fellow professional footballer Dapo Mebude.

Career statistics

Notes

References

2004 births
Living people
Footballers from Greater London
English people of Scottish descent
English people of Nigerian descent
English footballers
Scottish footballers
Scotland youth international footballers
Association football forwards
Rangers F.C. players
Manchester City F.C. players
Black British sportspeople